Through Our Darkest Days is the seventh studio album by the Danish melodic death metal band Mercenary. It features the band's newest drummer Peter Mathiesen who joined the band as a regular member in 2012 after performing more than 50 shows with them. 

For the first time the cover artwork was done by Mircea Gabriel Eftemie the guitarist of the Danish metal band Mnemic. René Pedersen commented: "The cover artwork portraits a dark atmosphere, symbolizing the darkness that surrounds us everyday. But in darkness there is always a light, which in this case is symbolized by a burning candle, and the figure that holds its eyes in its hands, showing a piece of the world as seen through our eyes."

Track list
All tracks composed by Mercenary.
 "A New Dawn" – 5:15
 "Welcome the Sickness" – 5:18
 "Through Our Darkest Days" – 4:39
 "Dreamstate Machine" – 5:34
 "A Moment of Clarity" – 5:02
 "Beyond This Night" – 5:45
 "Starving Eyes" – 5:14
 "Generation Hate" – 4:50
 "Forever the Unknown" – 6:31
 "Holding On to Serenity" (bonus track) – 5:06

Credits
Band members
René Pedersen – vocals, bass
Jakob Mølbjerg – rhythm guitar
Martin Buus – lead guitar, keyboards
Peter Mathiesen – drums

Guest appearances
 Kim Olesen – keyboards

Additional credits
Jakob Hansen – producer
Mircea Gabriel Eftemie – cover artwork

References

2013 albums
Mercenary (band) albums
Albums produced by Jacob Hansen